The Ahlul Bayt Assembly of Canada is a federation of Shi'a Muslim organizations in Canada and includes 80 Shi'a Islamic centres and mosques in the country. The organization was founded in 1993 by Shia Muslim leaders in Canada. It had been registered with the Government of Canada as a charitable organization until 2019 when the Canada Revenue Agency stripped of the organization of its charitable status after it was alleged that the group was “acting as a facilitator organization to support the operational goals” of the Ahl Al-Bayt World Assembly in Iran, which has links to the Lebanese Hezbollah and its goal is “to facilitate the spread of the Iranian revolutionary ideology in Canada.”

Programs
Since its inception, the Ahlul Bayt Assembly has been involved in activities such as:
 Holding Islamic Conferences 
 Right Path Magazine 
 Holding community wide Eidul Adha prayer 
 Eidul Fitr celebration 
 Publishing Islamic booklets

See also
Ismaili Centre, Toronto
Shia Islam in Canada
List of Canadian Shia Muslims

References

Islamic organizations based in Canada
Shia Islam in Canada
Canadian Shia Muslims